William J. Keller was an American college football player coach. He was the second head football coach at Vanderbilt University, serving for one season, in 1893, compiling a record of 6–1. Keller also played and served as team captain for the Vanderbilt Commodores for both the 1893 and 1894 seasons. Before coming to Vanderbilt, he played at the International Young Men's Christian Association Training School—now known as Springfield College—in Springfield, Massachusetts for Amos Alonzo Stagg.

Head coaching record

References

Year of birth missing
Year of death missing
19th-century players of American football
American football quarterbacks
Springfield Pride football players
Vanderbilt Commodores football coaches
Vanderbilt Commodores football players